Werewolf (also known as Arizona Werewolf) is an American direct-to-video horror film directed by Tony Zarrindast and starring Jorge Rivero, Richard Lynch, Federico Cavalli, Adrianna Miles, and Joe Estevez.

The film received negative reception from critics. It is best known for being lampooned in a 1998 episode of Mystery Science Theater 3000.

Plot 
Archaeologists working in the Arizona desert find a skeleton that appears to be a werewolf. The ill-tempered foreman, Yuri (Jorge Rivero) gets into a fight with his crew: Tommy (Jules Desjarlais), Joel (Joe Estevez), and Bill (Randall Oliver). In the course of the fight, Tommy is scratched by the werewolf skeleton. This greatly alarms his fellow workers, especially Joel, who incredulously utters the word "yetiglanchi." The head archaeologist, Noel (Richard Lynch), dismisses all Native Americans from the site, but in a private meeting later that day, explains that a major problem may be developing; American Indian mythology holds that a "yetiglanchi" is a dangerous individual who takes on predatory lupine characteristics and kills humans.

Tommy is taken to the hospital, where he begins to exhibit signs of lycanthropy. Yuri sneaks into the hospital and appears to facilitate Tommy's transformation. Shortly thereafter, Tommy fully transforms into a wolf and escapes after killing several people, but Joel and Bill are waiting by his house armed with silver bullets, and they kill him in turn.

The action then shifts to a house in suburban Flagstaff, where a writer named Paul Niles (Federico Cavalli) arrives to take up residence. It is explained that the archaeologists have invited Paul to the area for the purpose of publicizing their find and obtaining funding for their continued research. At a party, Paul is introduced to another foreign-sounding member of the team, Natalie Burke (Adrianna Miles), and he takes a romantic interest in her. Yuri is expelled from the party after sexually harassing Natalie, but improvises a plan to create a new werewolf out of an unsuspecting security guard (director Tony Zarrindast). Yuri is again successful in doing so, but this werewolf attempts to drive his car, and shortly meets his death by running into a stack of flammable oil barrels that were inexplicably placed in the middle of the road.

The following day, Paul visits the lab at Natalie's invitation and is violently attacked by Yuri, who strikes him with the werewolf skull. Paul almost immediately begins showing signs of lycanthropy, even as Natalie attempts to comfort him through an encounter implied to be sexually intimate. An extended series of scenes show Paul's temperament and physical appearance changing, even as Paul himself remains frightened by the sudden changes. Finally, at a pool hall where Natalie and Yuri are both present, Paul transforms fully into a werewolf, turns feral, and runs out into the streets on a rampage. He assaults several anonymous people and characters from earlier in the film's action, but runs into the woods without a confirmed kill.

Yuri and Noel speak on the phone about capturing Paul and exhibiting him as a freak show, but this enrages Natalie, who wishes to save Paul from such a fate. A chase scene ensues in which Yuri attempts to follow Paul into the desert brush, but Paul locates Yuri and violently kills him. Natalie arrives on the scene late, sees Yuri's dead body, and then returns to Paul's apartment. In a twist ending, Paul takes Natalie by the hand romantically, and it is slowly revealed that both of them are now werewolves.

Cast
 Jorge Rivero as Yuri
 Richard Lynch as Noel
 Federico Cavalli as Paul Miles
 Adriana Stastny as Natalie Burke (credited as Adrianna Miles)
 Joe Estevez as Joel
 R.C. Bates as Sam / The Keeper
 Randall Oliver as Billy
 Jules Desjarlais as Tommy
 Heidi Bjorn as Carrie
 Tony Zarrindast as Security Guard

Production
Several scenes from Werewolf were shot on the campus of Glendale Community College in Glendale, California.  The lab scenes took place in the old Physical Science building before it was refurbished in the early 2000s. The footbridge that crosses Verdugo Road, in front of the College, is seen in several nighttime shots.

Release and reception
In addition to being released on VHS, the film was also released on DVD in North America during 1997, making it among the earliest titles to be released to the format.

Reception to the film was widely negative. The Times Colonist criticized the acting and editing, adding that it made Plan 9 from Outer Space look like Independence Day. Fort Worth Star-Telegram gave it one star, calling it  "silly, uneven and badly acted". Jim Craddock, author of VideoHound's Golden Movie Retriever, also gave it one star.

Dave Nuttycombe of Washington City Paper wrote in 1997, "Moving the werewolf myth from eastern Europe to southwestern America and transposing it into Navaho lore is a good idea; hiring the Greater Flagstaff Remedial Theater Auxiliary to perform and buying the monster suit in the Halloween aisle at CVS are not."

Mystery Science Theater 3000
Werewolf was lampooned in a 1998 episode of comedy television series Mystery Science Theater 3000.  It is noteworthy for having been mocked on MST3K only two years after its release, and was also the most recent film to be featured on the series until Future War was featured the following season.  Mike and the 'bots joked about the film's incredibly poor sound editing and special effects, with the eponymous monster appearing to be "simply a wolf, other times a kind of man-bear, other times a sort of fruit bat puppet, and at still other times, just a guy with the mumps overdue for a shave." – as well as the thick accents of its leading actors ("Paul! You is a war-wilf!") and the poorly-delivered lines ("This is absolutely fascinating" is said without any emotion, for example). All profanity was censored, most notably Sam the Keeper's line, "I just found out that Count Dracula was a faggot!"

Cast member and episode director Kevin Murphy summed up the experience with the famous quote, "Werewolf is a gift from God." Fellow writer Bill Corbett said, "[Werewolf] was set in the Southwest but had all of these inexplicably Eastern European people mangling the pronunciation of the word werewolf—there are about seven different ways they pronounced it. And the werewolf looks really different every time. It’s like they had a new makeup artist recruited every day to do it. Sometimes it looked like a little bat; sometimes it just looked like a guy with some fur glued to his nose."

References

External links
 
 
 
 

1996 horror films
1996 direct-to-video films
American independent films
1990s English-language films
Films set in deserts
Films set in Flagstaff, Arizona
Films shot in California
Films shot in Los Angeles
Films shot in Mexico
1990s monster movies
American werewolf films
1996 films
1996 independent films
1990s rediscovered films
Rediscovered American films
1990s American films